"Hard to Say" is the title of a popular song from 1981 written and performed by the American singer-songwriter Dan Fogelberg. The song first appeared on Fogelberg's album The Innocent Age.

Fogelberg wrote the song while recovering from surgery. The song features backing vocals by singer Glenn Frey of the Eagles. The song became Fogelberg's third Top 10 hit on the Billboard Hot 100 chart when it peaked at No. 7 in October 1981. It also spent three weeks at No. 2 on the Billboard adult contemporary chart. It became his greatest hit in Canada, where it peaked at No. 16 Pop and No. 1 AC.

Chart performance

Weekly charts

Year-end charts

References

External links
 

1981 singles
Dan Fogelberg songs
Songs written by Dan Fogelberg
Full Moon Records singles
1980 songs